The yellow-throated fulvetta (Schoeniparus cinereus) is a species of bird in the family Pellorneidae. Its common name is misleading, because it is not a close relative of the "typical" fulvettas, which are now in the family Paradoxornithidae.

It is found in south-eastern Asia from the Himalayas to north-central Vietnam. Its natural habitat is subtropical or tropical moist montane forests.

References

Collar, N. J. & Robson, C. 2007. Family Timaliidae (Babblers)  pp. 70 – 291 in; del Hoyo, J., Elliott, A. & Christie, D.A. eds. Handbook of the Birds of the World, Vol. 12. Picathartes to Tits and Chickadees. Lynx Edicions, Barcelona.

yellow-throated fulvetta
Birds of Bhutan
Birds of Northeast India
Birds of Myanmar
Birds of Laos
yellow-throated fulvetta
yellow-throated fulvetta
Taxonomy articles created by Polbot